Nong Kung Si is a district (amphoe) in the western part of Kalasin province, northeastern Thailand.

History
The government separated Tambon Nong Kung Si and Khok Khruea from Tha Khantho district and created Nong Kung Si minor district (king amphoe) on 14 September 1973. Later Tambon Nong Bua of Sahatsakhan district was assigned to the minor district in 1975. It was upgraded to a full district on 25 March 1979.

Geography
Neighboring districts are (from the northeast clockwise): Sam Chai, Sahatsakhan, Mueang Kalasin, Yang Talat, and Huai Mek of Kalasin Province; Kranuan of Khon Kaen Province; Tha Khantho of Kalasin Province; and Wang Sam Mo of Udon Thani province.

Administration
The district is divided into nine sub-districts (tambons), which are further subdivided into 111 villages (mubans). There are two townships (thesaban tambons): Nong Hin covers parts of tambons Nong Hin and Dong Mun, and Nong Kung Si parts of tambons Lam Nong Saen. There are a further eight tambon administrative organizations (TAO).

References

External links
amphoe.com

Nong Kung Si